Stoopnagle and Budd were a popular radio comedy team of the 1930s, who are sometimes cited as forerunners of the Bob and Ray style of radio comedy. Along with Raymond Knight (The Cuckoo Hour), they were radio's first satirists.  

Musician Wilbur Budd Hulick (1905–1961) and former broker-lumberman Frederick Chase Taylor (1897–1950) were both announcers at Buffalo station WMAK (now WBEN) in 1930. The great-grandson of British-born Aaron Lovecraft of Rochester, New York, Taylor was a second cousin once removed of author H. P. Lovecraft, and was related to Chief Justice Salmon P. Chase.

Radio

Hulick and Taylor came together as a team when a transmitter failure kept the station from receiving the scheduled network program. To prevent dead air, they delivered a barrage of spontaneous, impromptu patter. Hulick called Taylor "Colonel Stoopnagle" while Taylor played "I Love Coffee, I Love Tea" and other selections on the organ. The audience responded with so much enthusiasm that the duo's goofiness became a regular feature on WMAK, generating such local interest that within a year they were headed for New York City.

Amid much network hoopla, they were heard on The Gloomchasers, beginning on CBS May 24, 1931. Spouting Spoonerisms, Taylor became known under the full name Colonel Lemuel Q. Stoopnagle as the partners appeared in several different formats on CBS, creating a variety of voices for their crazy characters, addlepated antics and wacky interviews. Typical of the Colonel's whimsical remarks: "If it weren't for half the people in the United States, the other half would be all of them", "Stoopnocracy is peachy", and "People have more fun than anybody". The announcer on their early 1930s shows was Louis Dean (1874–1933).

For many years a rumor circulated that novelist Robert Bloch was a scriptwriter for the program, but Bloch stated that he only sold the team a few gags shortly after he graduated from high school.

NBC president Pat Weaver recalled how the two zanies "used to come into my office and, while we talked, lick my supply of stamps, one after another, and flip them up to stick on the ceiling. There was a knack to it that I never mastered, but they carried it off with amazing success. By the end of the summer my ceiling was virtually papered with stamps."

Film
The public finally saw them in action when Paramount released International House (1933). Their very brief appearance—which looks like it might have been staged for one of Paramount's Hollywood on Parade short subjects—shows the colonel demonstrating his newest inventions, including "a revolving goldfish bowl for tired goldfish". The duo also appeared in Fleischer Studios's Screen Songs cartoon Stoopnocracy, released on August 18, 1933, in which they appeared in a live-action segment in the middle of the cartoon. They filmed a two-reel comedy for Educational Pictures in 1934, The Inventors, in which they show a college class how to assemble a "Stoopenstein", their version of a Frankenstein monster.

Stoopnagle & Budd also appeared in a two-reel musical comedy for Vitaphone, Sky Symphony, and they were featured in the Vitaphone short Rambling 'Round Radio Row #1 (1932).

As solo performers 

Taylor and Hulick were forced into a trial separation in November 1935, when their scripted, sponsored program for CBS failed to achieve the success of their free-wheeling, unsponsored shows. CBS reassigned the partners temporarily: Taylor went on a California vacation while Hulick led an orchestra of studio musicians. (Hulick later married the vocalist.) Taylor and Hulick were reunited in January 1936 but left within a few months. Later in 1936, Fred Allen hired them as his summer replacement. Then the NBC Blue Network engaged them to star as The Minute Men (1936–37). "Stoopnagle and Budd" made their last radio appearance on February 16, 1938, with the Paul Whiteman orchestra, after which they dissolved their partnership. 

Neither Taylor nor Hulick ever commented on the separation and did not disclose the reasons for the split, but Billboard columnist Jerry Franken soon printed an explanation: "They couldn't be sold. Translated, that means their stuff was too good... The Stoop's humor was not of the wallop-in-the-mush variety, but more akin to [Fred] Allen's style with more nonsense." Franken reported that scriptwriters for the Whiteman show were ordered "not to write anything along the lines of [Taylor's] former work." The failure and humiliation were evidently too much for Taylor and Hulick to sustain, and they went their separate ways. 

The Mutual network hired Hulick almost immediately, as co-host of What's My Name? with Arlene Francis. He became a radio game-show emcee, hosting Mutual's Music and Manners and Quizzer Baseball before relocating to Pennsylvania for a career in farming.

Taylor, retaining his "Col. Lemuel Q. Stoopnagle" stage name, appeared in comedy movie shorts and whimsical radio programs. After a radio comedy series with Donald Dickson on the Yankee Network in New England, Taylor was a summer substitute for Fred Allen on Town Hall Tonight in 1938. "Col. Stoopnagle" substituted for Burns and Allen (1943), Duffy's Tavern (1944), Bob Hawk (1947), and Vaughn Monroe's Camel Caravan (1947–48). Taylor also achieved success as a whimsical quizmaster, in Quixie Doodles on Mutual and CBS (1939–1944), The Colonel (1943), and Stoopnagle's Stooperoos (1943).  Furthermore, Taylor was also a quizmaster on an experimental television program in July, 1944, on Schenectady station WRGB.

Books

Taylor had four books published under the name of "Colonel Stoopnagle", including:

 You Wouldn't Know Me from Adam (1944) (Foreword by Fred Allen)
 Father Goosenagle: Nonsense and Fun for Everyone (1945)
 My Tale is Twisted! Or the Storal to This Mory (1946)
 My Back to the Soil; or, Farewell to Farms (1947)

Among Taylor's book introductions/forewords:
 Paul Webb Comin' Round the Mountain (1938)
 Lawrence Lariar, editor Best Cartoons of the Year 1945 (1945)

Later lives

F. Chase Taylor was married twice, first to Lois deRidder of Rochester, New York (divorced 1936), then to newspaperwoman Kay Bell. Budd Hulick married his erstwhile radio vocalist, Wanda Hart.

Taylor made one foray into the new medium of television (other than the experimental 1944 broadcast, referred to above), Colonel Stoopnagle's Stoop (1949). That same year Ed Gardner invited Taylor to join his production company in Puerto Rico, to write scripts and make appearances on Duffy's Tavern. Taylor was working in these capacities when he fell ill in 1950. He died in Boston of a heart ailment at the age of 52, survived by his wife.  

Hulick returned to his radio roots in 1950, back at WKBW in Buffalo, as co-host of the late-weekday-afternoon half-hour The Mr. and Mrs. Budd Hulick Show, a light-conversation program aimed at the feminine audience. The Hulicks relocated to New Jersey in 1956, where Hulick became a local radio personality. He died in Florida in 1961.

References

External links

Rick Squires' Stoopnocracy is Peachy!

American comedy duos
American comedy radio programs